Three Girls Lost is a 1931 American Pre-Code drama film directed by Sidney Lanfield and starring Loretta Young, Lew Cody, and John Wayne. The film also featured Ward Bond (in a small unbilled role), and co-starred Wayne with Paul Fix for the first time. Based on a story by Robert Hardy Andrews, the film is about a young man (Wayne) who finds himself suspected of involvement in the murder of a gangster.

Plot
Architect Gordon Wales finds his pretty young neighbor Marcia Tallant locked out of her apartment and flirts with her. He later is instrumental in getting her a job working for a gangster named William Marriott. When Marriott is murdered, suspicion falls on Wales after the police come to believe he was jealous of Marriott's relationship with Marcia. Unbeknownst to the police however, Wales had actually found himself attracted to Marcia's roommate Norene. When Wales is accused of murder, Norene uses her influence to obtain legal aid for him.

Cast

Loretta Young as Norene McMann 
Lew Cody as William (Jack) Marriott 
John Wayne as Gordon Wales 
Joan Marsh as Marcia Tallant 
Joyce Compton as Edna Best
George Beranger as Andre
Ward Bond as Airline Steward (unbilled)
Paul Fix as Tony Halcomb
Willie Fung as Chinese Headwaiter
Tenen Holtz as Photographer
Hank Mann as Taxicab Driver
Robert Emmett O'Connor as Detective

See also
 John Wayne filmography

References

External links

1931 films
1930s English-language films
1931 drama films
American black-and-white films
Films directed by Sidney Lanfield
American drama films
Fox Film films
1930s American films